Turkmen State Medical University named after Myrat Garryev is a Turkmen medical university. Founded in 1931, it is the only medical university in Turkmenistan with more than 3,000 students.  It is located in Ashgabat. The university reports to the Ministry of Health and the Ministry of Education of Turkmenistan. The current rector is Nargozel Myratnazarova.

History 
It was founded as Turkmen State Medical Institute on December 29, 1931. In 2010 Turkmen Medical Institute became the Turkmen State Medical University. On September 1, 2010, a new building at the State Medical University opened; it is located near the "Palace of ice".

In March 2019, by the Resolution of the Mejlis of Turkmenistan, the Turkmen State Medical University was named after a political and public figure - Academician of the Academy of Sciences of Turkmenistan, Deputy Chairman of the Council of Elders of Turkmenistan Myrat Orazgulyevich Garryyev.

Name 
 Turkmen State Medical Institute (1932—1981) 
 Turkmen Order of Friendship of Peoples State Medical Institute (1981—1997)
 State Medical Institute of Turkmenistan (1997—2010)
 Turkmen State Medical University (2010-2019) 
 Turkmen State Medical University named after Myrat Garryev (2019–present)

Faculty 
 Medical
 Pediatrics
 Dentistry
 Pharmacy 
 Preventive medicine
 Military Medicine

Military faculty 
Military students studying at the Military Medical Faculty gain practical experience in the field of military medicine. Graduates become doctors and nurses in the Armed Forces of Turkmenistan.

University centers 
The following centers operate at the university:
 Dental Training and Production Center
 Scientific and Clinical Center for Eye Diseases
 Educational and Scientific Center for Maternal and Child Health Protection
 Research Center for Medical Biotechnology
 Research Center for Sports Medicine

Honorary awards 

 In 1981, the institute was awarded the Order of Friendship of Peoples "for merits in the development of public health, medical science and training of highly qualified specialists".
 In 2011, the university received the European Quality Award from the European Business Assembly nominations committee “for achieving high quality educational services”.
 In 2012, the university was included in the Avicenna Directories of the World Health Organization.
 In 2022, the university was included in the World Directory of Medical Schools.

References

Links 
 Official web-site
 Information at World Derictory of Medical Schools

Universities in Turkmenistan
Buildings and structures in Ashgabat
Educational institutions established in 1931
1931 establishments in the Soviet Union
Education in the Soviet Union
Education in Turkmenistan
Educational organizations based in Turkmenistan